Subcetate is a commune in Harghita County, Transylvania, Romania. It is composed of four villages:
Călnaci (Kalnács), Duda (Dudád), Filpea (Fülpe), and Subcetate.

The commune lies on the banks of the Mureș River. It is located in the northwestern part of the county, on the border with Mureș County.

The Subcetate railway station serves the CFR Line 400, which connects Brașov to Satu Mare.

Population
According to the census in 2002 the commune had a population of 2,105. Ethnic Romanians were the majority, with 1,960 people (93%). Although Subcetate historically belongs to the Székely Land, only 100 Hungarians (5%) lived in the village in 2002. 94% of the population followed the Romanian Orthodox faith.

References

Communes in Harghita County
Localities in Transylvania